Gogama station is an inter-city railway station in Gogama, Ontario, Canada operated by Via Rail. Via's transcontinental Canadian trains stop here.

The town of Gogama is also served by Ontario Northland Motor Coach Services at Miros Gas & More near Gogama station. Ontario Northland offers inter-city bus connections south to Sudbury and north to Timmins and Cochrane station, the southern terminus of the Ontario Northland Railway Polar Bear Express train. From Cochrane, the Polar Bear Express continues north to its terminus at Moosonee station, 12 miles (19 km) south of the shore of James Bay on the north bank of the Moose River.

References

External links
 Gogama railway station
 Ontario Northland Bus Schedules 500 and 600 Sudbury - Timmins - Hearst

Via Rail stations in Ontario
Railway stations in Sudbury District
Canadian Northern Railway stations in Ontario